Julia Lavrentieva (born 11 June 1997) is a Ukrainian pair skater. With partner Yuri Rudyk, she is a three-time Ukrainian national champion (2011–2012, 2014) and placed 11th at the 2013 European Championships.

Programs 
(with Rudyk)

Competitive highlights 
(with Rudyk)

References

External links 

 

Ukrainian female pair skaters
1997 births
Living people
Sportspeople from Kyiv
Figure skaters at the 2014 Winter Olympics
Olympic figure skaters of Ukraine